

House of Representatives

Secretary of State 
Democrat John Fernandez (mayor of Bloomington) and Republican Todd Rokita (Deputy Secretary of State) faced off in this election. Todd Rokita won with 55% of the vote

Auditor 
Republican Connie Nass faced off against Democrat Barbara Huston, and Nass won by a huge margin of nearly 60%

Treasurer 
Republican Tim Berry beat Democrat Day Smith by a considerably large margin, of around 61%

References

 
Indiana